Urenui is a settlement in northern Taranaki, in the North Island of New Zealand. It is located on State Highway 3 close to the shore of the North Taranaki Bight, 13 kilometres east of Waitara and 6 km south-west of Mimi. The Urenui River flows past the settlement into the North Taranaki Bight.

Etymology

A fuller explanation is that the name was given by Manaia in honour of his well-endowed son.  means "penis", and  means "large".

History

The town was the site of the Urenui Redoubt, created in winter 1865 during the Second Taranaki War. Originally envisioned as a settlement for Māori loyal to the colonial government, however by 1866 it was decided that the town should be a settlement for soldiers.

Demographics

Urenui had a population of 414 at the 2018 New Zealand census, a decrease of 18 people (−4.2%) since the 2013 census, and a decrease of 15 people (−3.5%) since the 2006 census. There were 186 households, comprising 210 males and 198 females, giving a sex ratio of 1.06 males per female, with 63 people (15.2%) aged under 15 years, 45 (10.9%) aged 15 to 29, 180 (43.5%) aged 30 to 64, and 126 (30.4%) aged 65 or older.

Ethnicities were 89.1% European/Pākehā, 20.3% Māori, 0.0% Pacific peoples, 0.7% Asian, and 1.4% other ethnicities. People may identify with more than one ethnicity.

Although some people chose not to answer the census's question about religious affiliation, 55.8% had no religion, 31.9% were Christian, 0.7% were Buddhist and 0.7% had other religions.

Of those at least 15 years old, 36 (10.3%) people had a bachelor's or higher degree, and 81 (23.1%) people had no formal qualifications. 54 people (15.4%) earned over $70,000 compared to 17.2% nationally. The employment status of those at least 15 was that 153 (43.6%) people were employed full-time, 45 (12.8%) were part-time, and 3 (0.9%) were unemployed.

Marae

Urenui Marae, located about 3 kilometres from the town, is the only remaining marae of Ngāti Mutunga. It includes Te Aroha meeting house.

In October 2020, the Government committed $363,060 from the Provincial Growth Fund to upgrade the marae, creating 21 jobs.

Education
Urenui School is a coeducational contributing primary (years 1–6) school with a roll of  students as of  The school was founded in 1876 and celebrated its 125th jubilee in 2001.

Notable people
 Māui Pōmare, politician
 Te Rangi Hīroa (Sir Peter Buck), doctor, politician

See also
 Ngati Mutunga
 Taranaki Region

References

Further reading

External links

 Urenui Marae
 Urenui School website

New Plymouth District
Populated places in Taranaki